is a railway station on the Minobu Line of Central Japan Railway Company (JR Central) located in the town of Minobu, Minamikoma District, Yamanashi Prefecture, Japan.

Lines
Kunado Station is served by the Minobu Line and is located 58.8 kilometers from the southern terminus of the line at Fuji Station.

Layout
Kunado Station has one side platform serving a single bi-directional track. The station is unattended.

Adjacent stations

History
Kunado Station was opened on December 17, 1927 as a station on the original Fuji-Minobu Line. It has been unattended since the day of its opening. The line came under control of the Japanese Government Railways on May 1, 1941. The JGR became the JNR (Japan National Railway) after World War II. Along with the division and privatization of JNR on April 1, 1987, the station came under the control and operation of the Central Japan Railway Company. The station building was rebuilt in 1999.

Surrounding area
 The station is located in a rural area in what was formerly Kunado Village.

See also
 List of railway stations in Japan

External links

  Minobu Line station information 

Railway stations in Japan opened in 1927
Railway stations in Yamanashi Prefecture
Minobu Line
Minobu, Yamanashi